First Lieutenant John Grimball  of Charleston, South Carolina, a young lawyer from Columbia, South Carolina,  was commanding officer of Company A, 14th Tank Battalion during the battle to capture the Ludendorff Bridge over the Rhine on 7 March 1945. In the battle for the bridge over the Rhine, he led an understrength platoon of four of the newest heavy-duty T26E3 M26 Pershing tanks. Under his leadership, his unit played an instrumental role in capturing the last intact bridge across the Rhine, the only one of 22 road and 25 railroad bridges across the Rhine that the Germans had not yet blown up.

While serving with the 14th Tank Battalion, he had previously been awarded the Silver Star for actions on 17 December 1944 during the Battle of the Bulge near Steinbruck, Belgium. When his lead tank was disabled by a German Panzerfaust round, he remained with the tank and led his platoon in destroying the enemy who had attacked his tank. He then dismounted from the tank and led his crew and the remaining tanks "under continuous enemy fire with such stunning effect of enemy demoralization that 87 prisoners were taken."

Citation 

On 27 March 1945, Grimball was recognized for his actions leading to the capture of the bridge with the Distinguished Service Cross.

References

United States Army soldiers
United States Army personnel of World War II
Recipients of the Distinguished Service Cross (United States)
Possibly living people

Year of birth missing